Porto Palermo Castle (Albanian: Kalaja e Porto Palermos) is a castle near Himarë in southern Albania. It is situated in the bay of Porto Palermo, a few kilometers south of Himarë along the Albanian Riviera. Huffington Post ranked Porto Palermo first among 15 Undiscovered European Destinations for 2014. The area together with Llamani beach will be proclaimed a protected area holding the status of Protected Landscape by the Albanian Government. It is the most well preserved garrison erected by Ali Pasha in the region.

History

Due to its strategic position, the shores of Porto Palermo have been utilized for defensive purposes from antiquity to World War II.  

Porto Palermo Castle is a castle near Himara in southern Albania with an intriguing history. It is situated in the closed bay of Porto Palermo, a few kilometers south of Himarë, and makes nearly an island that is connected to the mainland by a narrow strip of land. The fort served as former Soviet submarine base during the communist regime in Albania, and nowadays its semi abandoned tunnel and barrack attract attention of visitors, as well as the stronghold walls and gates built by the powerful Ali Pasha of Ioannina.

The well preserved castle is asserted by guide books and the local tourist guides, to have been built in the early 19th century by Ali Pasha of Tepelena. In 1921 the castle was called Venetian. In 1803 Ali Pasha offered the castle and port to the Royal Navy. At which time the fort only had 4 or 5 cannon implying that Ali Pasha did not see the fort as important for him. Leake visited the fort and noted that the garrison consisted of 10 men with two four-pounders. Pouqueville in 1806 reports, "The tower or fort stands on the southern point of the entrance, connected with the continent by a low narrow isthmus. It consists of a square with bastions, having a few guns, of no service either to command the entrance or to protect the shipping at anchor. Near it are some warehouses, a custom-house, and a Greek church."

Literature
The erection of the castle by Ali Pasha was praised by Greek poet and member of Ali Pasha's court, Ioannis Vilaras.

See also
List of lighthouses in Albania
Tourism in Albania
Albanian Riviera
Geography of Albania
Porto Palermo Tunnel

References

External links
Picture of the lighthouse

Castles in Albania
Buildings and structures in Himara
Tourist attractions in Vlorë County